On October 20, 2012, Billboard relaunched many of its charts by incorporating the same methodology used for determining the rankings on the Billboard Hot 100 by a combination of sales, airplay, and streaming activity. Included in those changes were the R&B/Hip-Hop Songs, Rap Songs, and R&B/Hip-Hop Airplay charts, as well as the introduction of the R&B Songs chart. The R&B and Rap Songs charts serve as distillations of the overall R&B/Hip-Hop Songs chart and are aimed to highlight the differences between R&B and rap titles.

List of number ones

See also
2013 in music
List of number-one R&B albums of 2013 (U.S.)
List of number-one rap albums of 2013 (U.S.)
List of Hot 100 number-one singles of 2013 (U.S.)

References 

2013
United States RandB Singles
2013 in American music